Regina Pereira de Mendonca Uchoa (born ) is a  Brazilian female volleyball player. She was part of the Brazil women's national volleyball team.

She competed at the 1984 Summer Olympic Games, and at the 1986 FIVB Volleyball Women's World Championship.

References

External links

1959 births
Living people
Brazilian women's volleyball players
Place of birth missing (living people)
Olympic volleyball players of Brazil
Volleyball players at the 1984 Summer Olympics